Hans Michael Crouse (born September 15, 1998) is an American professional baseball pitcher in the Philadelphia Phillies organization. He made his MLB debut in 2021.

Amateur career
Crouse attended Dana Hills High School in Dana Point, California. As a senior, he struck out 99 batters in  innings, posting a 7–3 win–loss record with a 0.88 earned run average (ERA). He helped lead Dana Hills to the finals of the National High School Invitational and was named the Orange County Register's high school pitcher of the year. He committed to the University of Southern California to play college baseball. Crouse was considered one of the top prep prospects for the 2017 MLB Draft.

Professional career

Texas Rangers
Crouse was selected in the second round, 66th overall, by the Texas Rangers. He signed with the Rangers for a $1.45 million bonus and was then assigned to the AZL Rangers of the Rookie-level Arizona League, where he spent all of his first professional season, posting a 0.45 ERA with thirty strikeouts in twenty innings pitched along with an 0.70 WHIP. In 2018, he split time between the Spokane Indians of the Class A Short Season Northwest League and the Hickory Crawdads of the Class A South Atlantic League, compiling a combined 5–3 record and 2.47 ERA in 13 total starts between both teams.

Crouse was ranked as the #73 overall prospect in baseball by Baseball America in their preseason 2019 Top 100 list. Crouse was also ranked as the #85 overall prospect in baseball by MLB Pipeline in their preseason 2019 Top 100 list. Crouse was ranked as the #95 overall prospect in baseball by ESPN's Keith Law in his preseason 2019 Top 100 list.

Crouse was assigned back to Hickory for the 2019 season. Crouse produced a 6–1 record with a 4.41 ERA in  innings in 2019. He was hampered by bone spurs in his right elbow throughout the season, which forced him to miss almost a month of action and required surgery following the season to remove. Crouse did not play in a game in 2020 due to the cancellation of the Minor League Baseball season because of the COVID-19 pandemic. Crouse opened the 2021 season with the Frisco RoughRiders of the Double-A Central, going 3–2 with a 3.35 ERA and 54 strikeouts over 51 innings.

Philadelphia Phillies
On July 30, 2021, Crouse, Kyle Gibson, and Ian Kennedy were traded to the Philadelphia Phillies in exchange for Spencer Howard, Kevin Gowdy, and Josh Gessner. He split the remainder of the minor league season between the Reading Fightin Phils and the Lehigh Valley IronPigs.

On September 26, 2021, Crouse's contract was selected to the active roster to make his MLB debut that day versus the Pittsburgh Pirates. He was outrighted off the 40-man roster on November 9, 2022.

Personal life
Crouse has over twenty tattoos and designs them all himself.

References

External links

1998 births
Living people
People from Dana Point, California
Sportspeople from Orange County, California
Baseball players from California
Major League Baseball pitchers
Philadelphia Phillies players
Arizona League Rangers players
Spokane Indians players
Hickory Crawdads players
Frisco RoughRiders players
Reading Fightin Phils players
Lehigh Valley IronPigs players